Ingeborg "Inge" Helten (born 31 December 1950) is a former athlete from West Germany, who competed mainly in the 100 metres. She was born in Westum, Sinzig, Rhineland-Palatinate.

Biography
She won her first international Gold medal at the 1971 European Athletics Championships as a member of the 4 × 100 m relay team, where she placed 4th in the 100 metre final. She took a silver as the anchor of the 4 × 100 m relay squad in the 1974 European Championships in Rome.

Helten set a world record for 100 meters in June 1976, with an 11.04 clocking; she competed for West Germany at the 1976 Summer Olympics held in Montreal, Quebec, Canada in the 100 metres, winning a bronze medal behind teammate Annegret Richter and East German Renate Stecher. She placed 5th in the 200 meter final, where the top 5 women were German. She then joined with Annegret and fellow West Germans Elvira Possekel and Annegret Kroniger in the 4 × 100 m relay, where they won the silver medal behind the East Germans in 42.59 to 42.55.

See also
 German all-time top lists - 100 metres

References

External links 
 
 
 
 

1950 births
Living people
People from Sinzig
West German female sprinters
Athletes (track and field) at the 1976 Summer Olympics
Olympic silver medalists for West Germany
Olympic bronze medalists for West Germany
Olympic athletes of West Germany
World record setters in athletics (track and field)
European Athletics Championships medalists
Medalists at the 1976 Summer Olympics
Olympic silver medalists in athletics (track and field)
Olympic bronze medalists in athletics (track and field)
Olympic female sprinters
Sportspeople from Rhineland-Palatinate